Christopher Francis "Duke" Speyer (February 9, 1902 in Toronto, Ontario – December 26, 1966 in Toronto, Ontario) was a Canadian professional ice hockey forward who played 14 games in the National Hockey League. He played 5 games for the Toronto St. Pats in 1924, and 9 games for the New York Americans in 1934. The rest of his career, which lasted from 1923 to 1936, was mainly spent in the Canadian–American Hockey League.

Playing career
Played with Toronto St. Pats for two seasons, 1923–24 and 1924–25. He then played with the London Panthers with the CPHL, Niagara Falls Cataracts, New Haven Eagles with the CAHL, New York Americans with the NHL, Providence Reds and finally Springfield Indians, both CAHL. He retired 1935–36 season.

Career statistics

Regular season and playoffs

External links
Lost Hockey: Obituaries - S

1902 births
1966 deaths
Canadian ice hockey forwards
London Panthers players
New Haven Eagles players
New York Americans players
Niagara Falls Cataracts players
Providence Reds players
Ice hockey people from Toronto
Springfield Indians players
Syracuse Stars (IHL) players
Toronto St. Pats players